The 2013 Mississippi Valley State Delta Devils football team represented Mississippi Valley State University in the 2013 NCAA Division I FCS football season. The Delta Devils were led by fourth year head coach Karl Morgan and played their home games at Rice–Totten Field. They were a member of the East Division of the Southwestern Athletic Conference (SWAC).

Mississippi Valley State entered the season with a new offensive coordinator Karl Morgan, who was in his third season overall with the staff, after former offensive coordinator Ramon Flanigan became the head coach at The Lincoln University. On Media Day, Mississippi Valley State State was picked to finish fourth in the Eastern Division of the SWAC. They had two players, Defensive Lineman Robert Simpson and Defensive Back Kevin Euegene, selected to the Pre-Season All-SWAC 1st Team Defense. 2 additional players: wide receiver Julian Staford and offensive lineman Antonio Griggs, were selected as part of the All-SWAC 2nd Team Offense.

They finished the season 2–9, 2–7 in SWAC play.

Media
All Delta Devils games will once again be carried live on WVSD radio and can be heard online through Christiannet Cast.

Schedule

References

Mississippi Valley State
Mississippi Valley State Delta Devils football seasons
Mississippi Valley State Delta Devils football